The Hustlers is a 2010 Finnish comedy film directed by Lauri Nurkse.

Cast 
 Mikko Leppilampi as Saku
 Antti Luusuaniemi as Ässä
 Pihla Viitala as Anna
  as Vilma
 Malla Malmivaara as Rita
  as Alex
  as Stefu
 Eero Ritala as Panu

References

External links 

2010 comedy films
2010 films
Finnish comedy films
2010s Finnish-language films